Callidula lata is a moth in the  family Callidulidae. It is found on Bacan in Indonesia.

References

Callidulidae
Moths described in 1887